is a women's football club playing in Japan's football league, Kanto League. Its hometown is the city of Yokohama.

Squad

Current squad
As of 2 May 2022.

Coaching staff

Results

Transition of team name
Yokosuka Seagulls FC: 2006–2012
Yokohama FC Seagulls: 2013–2015
NHK Spring Yokohama FC Seagulls: 2016–present

References

External links
 official site
 Nadeshiko League official site
 Japanese Club Teams

Women's football clubs in Japan
Association football clubs established in 1991
1991 establishments in Japan
Sports teams in Yokohama
Yokohama FC